Selitrichodes is a genus of hymenopteran insects of the family Eulophidae.

References

Eulophidae
Taxa named by Alexandre Arsène Girault